Cotcliffe is a hamlet and civil parish in the Hambleton District of North Yorkshire, England. In 2015, North Yorkshire County Council estimated the population to be ten people.

References

External links

Civil parishes in North Yorkshire
Hambleton District
Hamlets in North Yorkshire